Eucochlidae is an extinct family of fossil sea snails, marine gastropod mollusks in the superfamily Trochoidea (according to the taxonomy of the Gastropoda by Bouchet & Rocroi, 2005). This family has no subfamilies.

Genera 
Genera within the family Eucochlidae include:
 Eucochlis – the type genus

References